The Prey of Gods is a 2017 young adult science fiction novel by Nicky Drayden. The audiobook was narrated by Prentice Anoyemi. It features characters who were queer, lesbian and gay.

References

2017 science fiction novels
Afrofuturist novels
LGBT African-American culture
American LGBT novels
HarperCollins books